Daisy Lake is a small lake in the Lake Superior and Lake Nipigon drainage basins in the amalgamated town of Greenstone, Thunder Bay District in northeastern Ontario, Canada.

The primary inflow is an unnamed creek at the east, and the primary outflow is an unnamed creek at the west, which flows through Morham Lake to the Namewaminikan River, a tributary of Lake Nipigon.

References

Lakes of Thunder Bay District